A Dún Laoghaire–Rathdown County Council election was held in Dún Laoghaire–Rathdown in Ireland on 24 May 2019 as part of that year's local elections. Forty councillors were elected for a five-year term of office from six local electoral areas (LEAs) by single transferable vote.

Following a recommendation of the 2018 Boundary Committee, the boundaries of the LEAs were altered from those used in the 2014 elections. Its terms of reference required no change in the total number of councillors but set a lower maximum LEA size of seven councillors, requiring a change to the eight-seat Dún Laoghaire LEA. Other changes were necessitated by population shifts revealed by the 2016 census.

Uniquely after 2019 Dún Laoghaire-Rathdown became Ireland's first 50:50 gender-neutral Council. Fine Gael remained the largest party gaining an additional 2 seats while seeing a slight reduction in vote-share. Fianna Fáil lost a seat in Stillorgan to return 7 in total and saw a slight reduction in vote share. The main winners in Dún Laoghaire were the Greens who won 6 seats and saw all 6 of their candidates elected in the process. They topped the poll in 4 of the 6 LEAs. Labour gained a seat in Dun Laoghaire but lost seats in Stillorgan and Glencullen-Sandyford to reduce their numbers to 6 seats overall. Solidarity-People Before Profit lost a seat in Dún Laoghaire to only return with 2 seats while Sinn Féin had a terrible election losing all 3 of their seats.

Results by party

Results by local electoral area

Blackrock

Dundrum

Dún Laoghaire

Glencullen–Sandyford

Killiney–Shankill

Stillorgan

Results by gender

Changes Since 2019
† Dún Laoghaire Fine Gael Cllr John Bailey died on 9 July 2019 of motor neuron disease. Mary Fayne was co-opted to fill the vacancy on 14 October 2019.
†† Dún Laoghaire Green Party Cllr Ossian Smyth was elected as a TD for Dún Laoghaire at the 2020 general election. Tom Kivlehan was co-opted to fill the vacancy on 24 February 2020.
††† Dún Laoghaire Fianna Fáil Cllr Cormac Devlin was elected as a TD for Dún Laoghaire at the 2020 general election. Justin Moylan was co-opted to fill the vacancy on 24 February 2020.
†††† Killiney-Shankill Fine Gael Cllr Jennifer Carroll MacNeill was elected as a TD for Dún Laoghaire at the 2020 general election. Frank McNamara was co-opted to fill the vacancy on 24 February 2020.
††††† Blackrock Fine Gael Cllr Barry Ward was elected to Seanad Éireann on the Industrial and Commercial Panel in the 2020 Seanad election on 4 April 2020.  On 6 July 2020, Maurice Dockrell was co-opted to fill the vacancy.
†††††† Blackrock Labour Cllr Deirdre Kingston resigned her council seat in 2020. On 6 July 2020, Martha Fanning was co-opted to fill the vacancy.
††††††† Glencullen-Sandyford Cllr Deirdre Ní Fhloinn resigned her council seat on 12 October 2020. Oisín O'Connor was co-opted to fill the vacancy on 14 December 2020.

Footnotes

Sources

References

2019 Irish local elections
2019